"When I Kissed the Teacher" is a song by the pop band ABBA. It is the opening track on their 1976 album Arrival.

Synopsis
The song's recording session's began on June 14, 1976, with the name "Rio de Janeiro". Eventually, the track was renamed "When I Kissed the Teacher". The song's light-hearted lyrics tell the story of a student who has a crush on her teacher, one day cannot restrain herself and kisses him.  The lyrics are set to spirited music. Benny Andersson considered this one of his favorite ABBA songs.

The video clip "goes from a female student longing for her teacher to her taking direct action by kissing him as he leans over her in class." The actor playing the part of the teacher was Magnus Härenstam.

Release
The song was also released on the compilation album More Gold: More Hits and the video was included on The Definitive Collection.

Composition
Lyrically and musically, the song is filled with "schoolgirl imagery". Agnetha Fältskog is the lead vocal.

Critical reception
Buffalo News describes it as "bouncy". The Daily Telegraph lists the song as one of ABBA's hidden gems, offering it as an alternative to "Waterloo". It says the song "Starts off slow, but quickly turns into a surreal, pop homage to low level sexual harassment". Robert Hilburn of the Malaysian Star said "My nomination for the best ABBA track that wasn't a hit in the U.S.: "When I Kissed the Teacher", a zestful number that recalls the teen passion of such Phil Spector productions as the Ronettes' 'Be My Baby'". In a Voulez-Vous review, "When I Kissed the Teacher" is listed alongside "Dancing Queen" as an example of the group's "soaring female harmonies, uplifting melodies, and festive instrumental touches" in their earlier hits. Chris Joens of the Chicago Tribune, in a review of the Mamma Mia musical, noted "A soundtrack has become a discography. I've even almost forgotten my favorite ABBA ditty, 'When I Kissed the Teacher', just because it's not in the show." The Los Angeles Times said "'When I Kissed the Teacher' is the most convincing thing Abba has done because it injects some sly, mocking humor and passion that offsets the group seriousness". Abba – Uncensored on the Record said When I Kissed The Teacher is an example of what was "expected of ABBA". The Teacher in American Society: A Critical Anthology lists "When I Kissed the Teacher" with the Van Halen song "Hot for Teacher" and the Jethro Tull song "Teacher" as examples of "how teachers are viewed by [students] as sexual objects.

Mamma Mia! Here We Go Again version
Lily James, Jessica Keenan Wynn, Alexa Davies and Celia Imrie recorded When I Kissed the Teacher, with a slightly changed lyric, as the first single from the soundtrack of Mamma Mia! Here We Go Again. Their version was released on May 8, 2018, by Capitol and Polydor Records. It was produced by Benny Andersson, and  Björn Ulvaeus plays one of the teachers in the clip.

Charts

Certifications

Other cover versions
With lyrics in Swedish by Ingela "Pling" Forsman, as När jag kysste lärar'n (meaning the same as the song title in English), the song was recorded by the Growing Girls in 1982., charting at Svensktoppen for two weeks between 18–25 April 1982. and with these lyrics the song was also recorded by Leif Bloms, acting as a B-side of the 1991 single Jag sjunger för dej (I Write You a Love Song) and also appearing on the 1993 album Dej ska jag älska all min tid.
Ann Christy recorded the Flemish rendering "Toen ik Leraar kuste" for her 1977 album Bravo: Christy also recorded "When I Kissed the Teacher" with its original English lyric for her 1977 album My Love, My Life.
On the 1995 New Zealand tribute album Abbasalutely, the song is covered by The Magick Heads.
In 1977, Tina Arena and John Bowles recorded a version for their album "Tiny Tina and Little John". 
The San Francisco Gay Men's Chorus recorded a cover of the song for their 1997 album ExtrABBAganza!.

References

1976 songs
ABBA songs
Songs written by Benny Andersson and Björn Ulvaeus
Leif Bloms songs
Songs about educators
Songs about kissing